The western yellow-bellied racer (Coluber constrictor mormon), also known as the western yellowbelly racer or western racer, is a snake subspecies endemic to the Western United States, including California, Oregon, Nevada, New Mexico, Utah, Montana and Colorado. It is a subspecies of the eastern racer. It is nonvenomous and is recognized by its long and very slender shape. It is visually similar to the eastern yellow-bellied racer, which is also green, blue or brown with a recognizable yellow underside. Also named for its color, the western yellow-bellied racer is also gray with red or brown blotches when young.

References

Colubrids
Fauna of the Western United States
Reptiles of the United States
Snakes of North America
Reptiles described in 1852